PR1/Mathiasen Motorsports is an American sports car racing team that currently competes in the LMP2 class of the WeatherTech SportsCar Championship.

History

American Le Mans Series
PR1/Mathiasen Motorsports began entering the series with the advent of the LMPC class in 2010, fielding a full-time entry for a revolving door of drivers. The team would achieve a best finish of second on three occasions that season, at Lime Rock, Mid-Ohio, and Road America. The following season, the team notched their first series victory at Road America, before taking class victory at Petit Le Mans to close out the season. After a 2012 season which saw the team win just one race, the 2013 season saw the team claim class victory at the 12 Hours of Sebring and mount a title challenge, falling six points short and finishing third in the team's championship, but with season-long driver Mike Guasch taking the drivers' title. Guasch, PR1's first full-season competitor in their ALMS career, was awarded the championship on a recount, after it was determined the 8Star Motorsports entry that had finished ahead of the team was not eligible for full-season points.

WeatherTech SportsCar Championship
The team maintained their level of competitiveness as the series merged to form the United SportsCar Championship. In its opening season, the team finished fourth in the team's and driver's championships with duo Gunnar Jeannette and Frankie Montecalvo, collecting podium finishes at Watkins Glen and Petit Le Mans. The 2015 began exceptionally for the team, taking class honors at both the 24 Hours of Daytona and 12 Hours of Sebring. Although retirements at the following two races at Laguna Seca and Detroit would derail the team's title chances, another class victory at Petit Le Mans, the second in team history, would see the team claim the North American Endurance Cup title in the PC class. In 2016, the team mounted their strongest title challenge yet, claiming the North American Endurance Cup for the second year running, but missing out on the PC class title on a races won tiebreaker with Starworks Motorsport.

2017 brought about the introduction of the revised Global LMP2 specifications, and the overhaul of the series' Prototype category. As a result, the team stepped away from PC competition to field a Ligier JS P217 in the championship's new top class. In their maiden season with the car, the team registered a best finish of fourth at Watkins Glen in July. The following season, PR1 entered their Ligier in a partnership with IndyCar team AFS Racing, with Colombian duo Sebastián Saavedra and Gustavo Yacamán behind the wheel. After finishing no higher than sixth in the opening eight races of the season, the team took delivery of an Oreca 07 chassis to replace the Ligier.

In 2019, PR1/Mathiasen Motorsports followed their chassis into the LMP2 class following the Prototype class split. The team won the 2019 class title in dominating fashion, winning all but the opening two races at Daytona and Sebring. They retained the class title in 2020, adding a class victory at the 12 Hours of Sebring and claiming the Michelin Endurance Cup title in class as well. 2021 saw the team claim their third consecutive LMP2-class title and second consecutive Michelin Endurance Cup crown, this time with Ben Keating and Mikkel Jensen at the wheel. For 2022, the team expanded to running two chassis in the LMP2 class for the full season, retaining their championship-winning 2021 lineup in the #52 while adding Steven Thomas and Jonathan Bomarito in the new #11 entry.

World Endurance Championship
For 2021, Patrick Kelly's Le Mans invitation prompted the team to step into the FIA World Endurance Championship for a partial season. The team established a partnership with Tech1 Racing to run the opening round at Spa, alongside Le Mans.

Racing results
(key) (Races in bold indicate pole position)

* Season still in progress.

Complete FIA World Endurance Championship results
(key) (Races in bold indicate pole position)

References

External links
Official Website

American auto racing teams
Auto racing teams established in 1990
1990 establishments in the United States
American Le Mans Series teams
WeatherTech SportsCar Championship teams
Atlantic Championship teams
24 Hours of Le Mans teams